Kathy Cronkite (born September 5, 1950) is an American actress and mental health professional. She is the daughter of the late, former CBS News anchorman Walter Cronkite.

Cronkite is a public speaker on issues related to mental health, especially depression. She is the author of the books On the Edge of Darkness: Conversations on Conquering Depression and On the Edge of the Spotlight: Celebrities' Children Speak Out About Their Lives.

In 1979, she co-starred on the short-lived NBC sitcom Hizzonner.

She also had roles in the movies Network, Billy Jack, The Trial of Billy Jack, Billy Jack Goes to Washington and Which Way Is Up.

Cronkite was previously married to William F. Ikard. They have two children. She lives in Austin, Texas.

Filmography

References

External links 

1950 births
American television actresses
Living people
Actresses from Washington, D.C.
21st-century American women